Impostor syndrome is the psychological pattern of doubting one's accomplishments and fearing being exposed as a "fraud".

Imposter Syndrome may refer to:

 Capgras delusion, a disorder in which a person believes another has been replaced by an identical impostor.
 Imposter Syndrome, a 2019 EP by Gracey
 Imposter Syndrome, a 2020 EP by Outline in Color